Glyptotendipes paripes is a species of midge in the family Chironomidae. It is found in Europe.

Subspecies
These three subspecies belong to the species Glyptotendipes paripes:
 Glyptotendipes paripes albobulatus Kruseman, 1933
 Glyptotendipes paripes flavipes Kruseman, 1933
 Glyptotendipes paripes paripes

References

Further reading

 

Chironomidae
Articles created by Qbugbot
Insects described in 1929